De Gaulle is a 2020 French biographical historical drama film written and directed by Gabriel Le Bomin, starring Lambert Wilson and Isabelle Carré as Charles and Yvonne de Gaulle.

Plot
Paris, June 1940. The country is facing military and political collapse as the Battle of France rages. A married couple, Charles de Gaulle and his wife Yvonne, are trying to cope with the situation at hand. When de Gaulle goes to as a brigadier general in the battle against the invading German army, his wife Yvonne remains at home and takes care of their three children: Anne, Philippe and little Elisabeth.

As the Germans activate Fall Rot, Paul Reynaud appoints de Gaulle as Defence Minister, under the command of Deputy Prime Minister Philippe Pétain whose body was responsible for collaboration with the British. While attending a cabinet meeting, de Gaulle is not met kindly by Pétain, General Maxime Weygand and Geoffroy Chodron de Courcel, who all feel that de Gaulle is not fit for office.

Following his visit to Weygand, who was aiming for a truce between French and the Germans, de Gaulle decides to fly to Britain to meet the British Prime Minister Winston Churchill to discuss the evacuation of the French army to French North Africa. It's only after that trip that Reynaud, Pétain, and Weygand change their view about de Gaulle. During the same month, de Gaulle attends a couple of Anglo-French Supreme War Council meetings where he meets Churchill and General Edward Spears on 11 June, and two days later meets the Earl of Halifax.

Following the successful meetings, de Gaulle offers his resignation, but the Interior Minister Georges Mandel urges him to stay. An escape from French North Africa with Edward Spears and Jean Laurent makes the German government suspicious and an arrest warrant is issued in de Gaulle's name. De Gaulle ends up landing in Britain and goes directly to Churchill, who suggests he should work for BBC Radio on 17 June. The next day, de Gaulle issues an appeal to the French people not to be demoralized and to continue fighting against the German aggressors.

It was during this time that Yvonne and her children left Colombey-les-Deux-Églises, as German forces continue to advance throughout France. By 25 June 1940, de Gaulle becomes the leader of the Free French and eventually becomes the President of the Republic.

Cast

Reception

Sandra Hall of The Sydney Morning Herald wrote "Wilson makes a very plausible de Gaulle. He has the height, the slimness and the posture and once he has the uniform on, it's easy to overlook the fact that he's much too handsome for the part".

Jordan Mintzer of The Hollywood Reporter called the film "A bland piece of hero worship".

References

External links

2020 films
2020 biographical drama films
2020s historical drama films
2020s biographical drama films
French biographical drama films
French historical drama films
Films set in France
Films set in Paris
Films set in London
French World War II films
Western Front of World War II films
Films set in 1940
Biographical films about military leaders
Cultural depictions of Charles de Gaulle
Cultural depictions of Philippe Pétain
Films about Winston Churchill
2020s French films